Jacek Magiera (born 1 January 1977 in Częstochowa) is a Polish football manager who most recently managed Śląsk Wrocław. He is a former footballer who played as a centre-back or defensive midfielder.

External links

1977 births
Association football defenders
Association football midfielders
Ekstraklasa players
MKS Cracovia (football) players
Legia Warsaw players
Living people
Polish footballers
Raków Częstochowa players
Sportspeople from Częstochowa
Widzew Łódź players
Polish football managers
Ekstraklasa managers
I liga managers
Zagłębie Sosnowiec managers
Legia Warsaw managers
Śląsk Wrocław managers
Jan Długosz University alumni